The 2023 Delaware State Hornets football team will represent Delaware State University as a member of the Mid-Eastern Athletic Conference (MEAC) during the 2023 NCAA Division I FCS football season. The Hornets, led by sixth-year head coach Rod Milstead, play home games at Alumni Stadium in Dover, Delaware.

Previous season

The Hornets finished the 2022 season with a record of 5–6, 2-3 MEAC play to finish in a tie for 3rd in the MEAC.

Schedule

References

Delaware State
Delaware State Hornets football seasons
Delaware State Hornets football